Morden and Rhineland is a former provincial electoral division in the Canadian province of Manitoba, which was represented in the Legislative Assembly of Manitoba from 1914 to 1949. The district was created by merging the former districts of Morden and Rhineland, and was located in the southernmost portion of the province encompassing communities such as Morden, Winkler and Altona. Due to its location, the political culture of the riding was very strongly dominated by Mennonites.

After 1949 the district was split between the reconstituted district of Rhineland and the new district of Manitou–Morden.

List of representatives

References

Former provincial electoral districts of Manitoba